Helsingborgs IF had a successful season with the return of Henrik Larsson from Barcelona putting the club into international spotlight. Following a dire start to the season, coach Peter Swärdh was sacked and replaced by Stuart Baxter, the Englishman's first Swedish job for five years. A strong end to the season saw Helsingborg briefly go into title contention, but that was not to be. Instead, Helsingborg beat Gefle 2-0 in the cup final, qualifying for the UEFA Cup as an effect.

Squad

Goalkeepers
  Daniel Andersson
  Oscar Berglund
  Pär Hansson

Defenders
  Tony Mahr
  Adama Tamboura
  Jacob Augustsson
  Andreas Jakobsson
  Andreas Granqvist
  Franco Miranda
  Erik Wahlstedt
  Fredrik Björck
  Oskar Rönningberg
  Andreas Landgren

Midfielders
  Fredrik Svanbäck
  Andreas Dahl
  McDonald Mariga
  Babis Stefanidis
  Fahrudin Karišik
  Eldin Karišik
  Patrik Åström

Attackers
  Olivier Karekezi
  Luton Shelton
  Henrik Larsson
  Gustaf Andersson
  Tobias Holmqvist
  Alexander Zaim

Allsvenskan

Matches

 Hammarby-Helsingborg 4-2
 1-0 Paulinho Guará 
 2-0 Paulinho Guará 
 3-0 Björn Runström 
 3-1 Gustaf Andersson 
 4-1 Max von Schlebrügge 
 4-2 McDonald Mariga 
 Helsingborg-GAIS 1-0
 1-0 Olivier Karekezi 
 IFK Göteborg-Helsingborg 2-2
 0-1 Olivier Karekezi 
 0-2 McDonald Mariga 
 1-2 Thomas Olsson 
 2-2 Jonas Wallerstedt 
 Helsingborg-AIK 1-1
 0-1 Wílton Figueiredo 
 1-1 Babis Stefanidis 
 Gefle-Helsingborg 1-0
 1-0 Kristen Viikmäe 
 Helsingborg-Öster 4-0
 1-0 Luton Shelton 
 2-0 Olivier Karekezi 
 3-0 Olivier Karekezi 
 4-0 Babis Stefanidis 
 Malmö FF-Helsingborg 3-1
 1-0 Edward Ofere 
 1-1 Babis Stefanidis 
 2-1 Afonso Alves 
 3-1 Marcus Pode 
 Helsingborg-Halmstad 1-1
 1-0 Luton Shelton 
 1-1 Dušan Đurić 
 Elfsborg-Helsingborg 0-0
 Helsingborg-Häcken 1-3
 0-1 Hans Berggren 
 1-1 Olivier Karekezi 
 1-2 Robert Mambu-Mumba 
 1-3 Daniel Larsson 
 Örgryte-Helsingborg 1-1
 1-0 Aílton Almeida 
 1-1 Gustaf Andersson 
 Helsingborg-Kalmar FF 2-1
 0-1 Viktor Elm 
 1-1 Henrik Larsson 
 2-1 Luton Shelton 
 Djurgården-Helsingborg 2-1
 1-0 Matias Concha 
 1-1 Luton Shelton 
 2-1 Tobias Hysén 
 Helsingborg-Djurgården 1-1
 1-0 Luton Shelton 
 1-1 Mattias Jonson 
 Helsingborg-Hammarby 3-1
 0-1 Max von Schlebrügge 
 1-1 Henrik Larsson 
 2-1 Henrik Larsson 
 3-1 Fredrik Svanbäck 
 GAIS-Helsingborg 0-2
 0-1 McDonald Mariga 
 0-2 Olivier Karekezi 
 Helsingborg-Malmö FF 3-1
 0-1 Jonatan Johansson 
 1-1 Luton Shelton 
 2-1 Luton Shelton 
 3-1 Gustaf Andersson 
 Halmstad-Helsingborg 1-1
 0-1 Henrik Larsson 
 1-1 Martin Fribrock 
 Helsingborg-Gefle 2-0
 1-0 Babis Stefanidis 
 2-0 Olivier Karekezi 
 Öster-Helsingborg 0-3
 0-1 Olivier Karekezi 
 0-2 Henrik Larsson 
 0-3 McDonald Mariga 
 Helsingborg-IFK Göteborg 3-2
 1-0 Fredrik Svanbäck 
 2-0 Babis Stefanidis 
 3-0 Henrik Larsson 
 3-1 Stefan Selaković 
 3-2 Pontus Wernbloom 
 AIK-Helsingborg 2-2
 0-1 Luton Shelton 
 1-1 Miran Burgič 
 2-1 Nicklas Carlsson 
 2-2 own goal 
 Helsingborg-Örgryte 2-1
 1-0 Olivier Karekezi 
 1-1 Ola Toivonen 
 2-1 Olivier Karekezi 
 Kalmar FF-Helsingborg 2-4
 1-0 Ari 
 1-1 own goal 
 1-2 Luton Shelton 
 1-3 Henrik Larsson 
 2-3 Ari 
 2-4 Henrik Larsson 
 Helsingborg-Elfsborg 1-1
 0-1 Mathias Svensson 
 1-1 Olivier Karekezi 
 Häcken-Helsingborg 3-0
 1-0 Dioh Williams 
 2-0 Teddy Lučić 
 3-0 Jonas Henriksson

Topscorers
  Olivier Karekezi 11
  Luton Shelton 9
  Henrik Larsson 8
  McDonald Mariga 4
  Babis Stefanidis 4
  Gustaf Andersson 3

Helsingborgs IF seasons
Helsingborg